Witherspoon-Hunter House is a historic home located at York, York County, South Carolina. It was built about 1825, and consists of a two-story, front section covered by a gable roof, with a one-story L-shaped rear annex.  The house is of frame construction and rests upon a raised brick basement. It features a double-tiered front portico. Also on the property is a small brick building.

It was added to the National Register of Historic Places in 1978.

References

Houses on the National Register of Historic Places in South Carolina
Houses completed in 1825
Houses in York County, South Carolina
National Register of Historic Places in York County, South Carolina